Euthria vandae is a species of sea snail, a marine gastropod mollusk in the family Buccinidae, the true whelks.

Description

Distribution

References

 Rolán E. & Monteiro A. (2007). New information on the genus Euthria (Mollusca: Buccinidae) from the Cape Verde archipelago, with the description of three new species. Gloria Maris 46(1-2): 1-22.
 Fraussen K. & Swinnen F. (2016). A review of the genus Euthria Gray, 1839 (Gastropoda: Buccinidae) from the Cape Verde archipelago. Xenophora Taxonomy. 11: 9-31

External links

Buccinidae
Gastropods described in 2007